Dominik Hašek (born January 29, 1965) is a Czech former ice hockey goaltender who mostly played for the Buffalo Sabres of the National Hockey League (NHL). Widely regarded as one of the best goaltenders of all time, Hašek also played for the Chicago Blackhawks, Detroit Red Wings and the Ottawa Senators in his 16-season National Hockey League (NHL) career, before finishing his career in Europe. During his years in Buffalo, he became one of the league's finest goaltenders, earning him the nickname "The Dominator". His strong play has been credited with establishing European goaltenders in a league previously dominated by North Americans. He is a two-time Stanley Cup champion, both with the Red Wings.

Hašek was one of the league's most successful goaltenders of the 1990s and early 2000s. From 1993 to 2001, he won six Vezina Trophies, the most under the award's current system of voting for the best individual goalie. In 1998 he won his second consecutive Hart Memorial Trophy, becoming the first goaltender to win the award multiple times. During the 1998 Winter Olympics in Nagano, Japan, he led the Czech national ice hockey team to its first and only Olympic gold medal. The feat made him a popular figure in his home country and prompted hockey legend Wayne Gretzky to call him "the best player in the game". While with the Red Wings in 2002, Hašek became the first European-trained starting goaltender to win the Stanley Cup. In the process, he set a record for shutouts in a postseason year.

Hašek was considered an unorthodox goaltender, with a distinct style that labeled him a "flopper". He was best known for his concentration, foot speed, flexibility, and unconventional saves, such as covering the puck with his blocker rather than his trapper. Hašek holds the highest career save percentage of all time (0.9223) and is seventh in goals against average (first in the modern era) (2.202), and the third-highest single-season save percentage (0.9366 in 1998–99). The record was broken by Tim Thomas in the 2010–11 season and again in the 2011–12 season by Brian Elliott, who now holds the record at .940. Hašek is the only goalie to face the most shots per 60 minutes and have the highest save percentage in one season. He did it twice while with the Sabres (1996 and 1998).

At the time of his retirement, he was the oldest active goalie in the NHL at 43, and the second-oldest active player in the league after Red Wings teammate Chris Chelios, who was 46. Hašek announced his retirement on June 9, 2008, but on April 21, 2009, he announced a comeback to professional hockey and signed a contract with HC Pardubice of the Czech Extraliga. On June 7, 2010, he signed with Spartak Moscow of the KHL and played the last season of his career with this team. Hašek announced his retirement on October 9, 2012. Hašek was inducted into the Hockey Hall of Fame on November 17, 2014. He is also a member of the Czech Ice Hockey Hall of Fame and the IIHF Hall of Fame. His number was retired by the Sabres and HC Pardubice. In 2017, he was named one of the '100 Greatest NHL Players' in history.

Early life
Hašek started playing hockey at the age of six in his native Czechoslovakia. As he explains:

In 1980, Hašek joined the top hockey league in the country, the Czechoslovak Extraliga, with his hometown team, HC Pardubice. He became the youngest hockey player in history to play at the professional level at age 16. He helped to win two league titles in 1987 and 1989. The next year, he was conscripted in the Czechoslovak Army and played for an army team Dukla Jihlava. After making his mark and eventually playing for the Czechoslovak national team, Hašek entered the NHL draft and was drafted by the Chicago Blackhawks in 1983. At the time, NHL teams were wary of drafting players from behind the Iron Curtain who were often barred from playing in NHL by their countries. Consequently, Hašek was picked in the 10th round (199th overall) and was the seventeenth goalie selected. Hašek did not even know he had been drafted until several months later.

Hasek played on the Czechoslovakia team in the 1988 Winter Olympics where the team earned a sixth place finish.

Until 1990, Hašek played in his native Czechoslovakia for HC Pardubice and Dukla Jihlava. He won the Golden Hockey Stick, given to the most valuable player in the Extraliga, in 1987, 1989 and 1990. He was named the Extraliga's Goaltender of the Year for four consecutive years from 1986 through 1990. His American career began with the Indianapolis Ice of the International Hockey League (IHL), where he played parts of two seasons. His NHL debut with the Blackhawks finally came in the 1990–91 season, seven years after the 1983 NHL Entry Draft.

NHL career

Chicago Blackhawks (1990–1992)
In Chicago, Hašek spent time as the backup to Ed Belfour, and played only 25 games over two seasons with the Blackhawks, splitting time between the Blackhawks and the Indianapolis Ice of the IHL. On November 6, 1990, wearing the number 34 (31 was worn by backup goaltender Jacques Cloutier that year), Hašek made his first NHL start in a 1–1 tie against the Hartford Whalers.
His first victory came on March 8, 1991, by a score of 5–3 over the Buffalo Sabres, and on January 9, 1992, he recorded his first shutout in a 2–0 win against the Toronto Maple Leafs. During this time with the Blackhawks, his goaltending coach was Vladislav Tretiak, who was selected in the 1983 draft but was barred from playing in the NHL by the Soviet government. Hašek appeared in game 4 of the 1992 Stanley Cup Finals against the Pittsburgh Penguins, after Belfour allowed two goals on four shots in the opening 6:33, and had 21 saves. Although the Penguins won and clinched the Stanley Cup, Hašek's performance attracted the attention of the Sabres, who had considered trading for him earlier that season.

Buffalo Sabres (1992–2001)
After the Stanley Cup finals appearance, Chicago decided to stay with Belfour and Jimmy Waite. Hašek was traded to the Buffalo Sabres for goalie Stéphane Beauregard and future considerations, which later materialized into a draft pick used to obtain Éric Dazé. In Buffalo, wearing number 39, he was initially the backup goaltender, playing behind Grant Fuhr. When Fuhr was injured partway through the 1993–94 season, Hašek was elevated to starter and soon developed into a top-tier goaltender. In 1994, he won his first Vezina Trophy, was runner-up for the Hart Memorial Trophy and shared the William M. Jennings Trophy with Fuhr. Hašek played 58 games with a league-best 1.95 goals against average (GAA), seven shutouts, and a .930 save percentage. He followed this feat by again winning the Vezina Trophy and again placing as a Hart finalist in 1994–95.

Hašek's success in the 1996–97 season was overshadowed by a conflict with then-head coach Ted Nolan. The conflict created a tense, clique-like atmosphere in the Sabres' clubhouse.
In game three of the first round series against the Ottawa Senators, Hašek removed himself in the second period and was replaced by Steve Shields. Hašek suffered a mild sprain of his right MCL, and the team doctor pronounced him day-to-day. However, the media and some teammates speculated Hašek was using his injury to bail out on the team. One such individual was Buffalo News columnist Jim Kelley, who wrote a column which detailed Hašek's injury and his conflict with Nolan, and questioned the goaltender's mental toughness. When Kelley approached Hašek for an interview after a loss in game five of the best-of-seven series, Hašek attacked the journalist and received a three-game suspension and a $10,000 (US) fine as a result of the incident. With Steve Shields in goal, the Sabres fought back against the Senators and took the series in seven games. However, Hašek did not play in the five-game loss in the following series against the Philadelphia Flyers.

Though General Manager John Muckler was named "Executive of the Year", he was fired for his constant feuding with Nolan. Hašek, who sided with Muckler, stated in an interview during the 1997 NHL Awards Ceremony that the team would benefit from replacing Nolan.
Despite winning the Jack Adams Award as top coach and being popular with the Sabres fanbase, Nolan was only offered a one-year contract extension by replacement GM Darcy Regier. He rejected this under the grounds that it was too short, and decided to part ways with the franchise. This upset many fans, who blamed Nolan's departure on Hašek's alleged attempt to rid him.
For the first six weeks of the next season he was booed so vigorously that arena workers would play tapes of a crowd cheering to help balance it out.
As the season progressed, the booing of Hašek ceased, as he posted a league-record seven shutouts in December and continued to play at an elite level. He won the Vezina Trophy again, as well as the Lester B. Pearson Award and the Hart Trophy for league MVP. He became one of the few goaltenders in NHL history to win the Hart, alongside Jacques Plante, Carey Price, Chuck Rayner, Al Rollins, José Théodore and Roy Worters.

Hašek played a career-high 72 games in the 1997–98 season, and set a team record with 13 shutouts. Six of these shutouts came in December, which tied the all-time NHL record for most in one month. He again won the Lester B. Pearson Award, the Hart Trophy, and the Vezina Trophy, becoming the first goalie in NHL history to win the Hart twice. He donated the $10,000 prize money after winning the Pearson Award in 1998 to the Variety Club of Buffalo. In the off-season he signed a three-year, $26 million deal, securing the highest goaltender salary contract at that time.

In 1998–99, Hašek averaged a career-best 1.87 GAA and .937 save percentage, capturing him his third consecutive Vezina, and fifth overall. He was also a finalist for the Hart and Pearson trophies. Though the Sabres did not have a stellar regular season and finished with the seventh seed in the Eastern Conference, they defeated the Ottawa Senators, Boston Bruins and Toronto Maple Leafs in the playoffs en route to a best-of-seven Stanley Cup Final against the Presidents' Trophy-winning Dallas Stars. The Sabres eventually lost the series four games to two, with the decisive sixth game being one of the longest Stanley Cup playoff games in NHL history. Hašek and Ed Belfour made 50 and 53 saves, respectively, in a sudden-death triple-overtime duel that only ended when Brett Hull scored a controversial Cup-winning goal with his skate in the goal crease.

The goal was not reviewed immediately, so officials did not notice Hull's skate in the crease until minutes later. After video reviews showed Hull's position, the goal was still upheld, leaving the Sabres infuriated. Hašek commented, "Maybe [the video goal judge] was in the bathroom. Maybe he was sleeping. Maybe he doesn't know the rule." The following season, NHL commissioner Gary Bettman announced that video replays would no longer be used to judge if players are in the crease or not, and that it would be a judgment call by the officiating crew. After the season ended, Hašek contemplated retirement because of a combination of injuries and a desire to become more involved in his family life. The announcement stunned many of his teammates, particularly Michael Peca and Jason Woolley.

In the 1999–2000 season, Hašek was hampered by a nagging groin injury. He missed forty games and failed to win a major NHL award for the first time in several years. Though he healed in time for the playoffs, the Sabres were eliminated in the first round in five games by the Flyers. In 2000–01—his final season with Buffalo—Hašek set a modern era record by collecting his sixth Vezina Trophy. He also won his second William M. Jennings Trophy. The Sabres played Philadelphia in the first round of the playoffs again, where Hašek outplayed his 1998 Olympic back-up Roman Čechmánek. In the clinching sixth game, Hašek recorded a shutout against the Flyers. In the second round, the Sabres played a seven-game series against Mario Lemieux's Penguins, which culminated with the Penguins winning the final game in overtime.

First tenure with the Detroit Red Wings (2001–2002; 2003–2004)
Before the start of the next season, Hašek was traded to the Detroit Red Wings in an attempt to lower the Sabres' payroll and to send Hašek to a more competitive team. He was dealt for Vyacheslav Kozlov, a first-round selection in the 2002 NHL Entry Draft and future considerations, which eventually became the draft pick of Jim Slater. During his first season with Detroit, Hašek posted a career-high 41 wins with just 15 losses, helping the Red Wings earn the President's Trophy with the league's best record. In the playoffs, he led the Wings past the Vancouver Canucks, the St. Louis Blues, the Colorado Avalanche and eventually the Carolina Hurricanes in the finals to win the Stanley Cup. During the Conference Finals against Colorado, he became the first goalie to be awarded an assist on an overtime game-winning goal in the post-season after passing the puck to Wings captain Steve Yzerman, who then assisted Fredrik Olausson in scoring the final goal of the third game of that series. He also set a record for most shutouts in a post-season with six, broken the year after by Martin Brodeur with seven.

That summer, Hašek officially announced his retirement so that he could spend time with his family and other hobbies.
However, after Detroit's first-round loss to the Mighty Ducks of Anaheim in the following season, he expressed his desire to play again. This created a difficult situation for the Red Wings, who had two years left on Curtis Joseph's three-year $24 million contract, which had a no-trade clause. Detroit was also under pressure knowing that the rival Avalanche would be looking for a goalie to replace Patrick Roy after his retirement. With Manny Legace also on the Wings' roster, Detroit now had three potential starting goalies.

In the 2003–04 season Hašek injured his groin after playing just 14 games. On January 9, he and the team agreed he should rest his injury for two to four weeks. Hašek privately told general manager Ken Holland that he would not accept any pay while he was injured. On February 10, he announced that he was not going to continue to play that season, surprising the Red Wings management. He eventually revealed that he refused about $3 million of his $6 million salary. In April 2004, he underwent groin surgery in Prague, and returned to his hometown of Pardubice to recuperate.

Ottawa Senators (2005–2006)
After his contract with the Red Wings expired, Hašek announced his intention to play for a Stanley Cup contender, and specifically named the Ottawa Senators as a possibility. On July 6, 2004, after trading Patrick Lalime to the St. Louis Blues, the Senators signed Hašek to a one-year deal.

During the 2004–05 NHL lockout, Hašek toured with the Primus Worldstars. Similar to the tour Wayne Gretzky and IMG formed during the 1994–95 NHL lockout, the Primus Worldstars Tour ran December 7–23, playing in seven different countries (Riga, Latvia; Moscow and St Petersburg, Russia; Bratislava, Slovakia; Bern, Switzerland; Karlstad, Jönköping and Linköping, Sweden; Oslo, Norway; Katowice, Poland) in ten scheduled games. The tour competed against all-star teams or club teams of each country.

Hašek played increasingly well for the Senators up until the 2006 Winter Olympics in Turin. During the season, he reached 300 career wins, and his GAA and save percentage were the second-best in the league. Upon departure to Turin, Hašek's equipment was accidentally left behind in Ottawa. This caused Hašek to miss a number of practices with the Czech national team. At the Winter Olympics, he injured his right adductor muscle while making a save in the first qualifying match against Germany, forcing him to leave the game after only 9 minutes and 25 seconds.
Hašek's injury caused him to miss the rest of the regular season and post-season, despite several rumours that he would return in time for the playoffs. He said that if he were to be re-signed, he would play for a base salary of $500,000 with bonuses.

After the Senators were eliminated in the second round, they opted not to re-sign Hašek.

Return to the Red Wings (2006–2008)

On July 31, 2006, at the age of 41, Hašek joined the Red Wings for the second time. He signed a one-year $750,000 US
contract, with added bonuses if the team succeeded in the playoffs. He posted 38 wins and a 2.05 GAA while leading the Red Wings to
the number one seed in the Western Conference. He also broke his own personal record by going 181 minutes and 17 seconds without allowing a goal.
Midway through the regular season, the team announced that to avoid injury and preserve Hašek for the playoffs, he would not play on consecutive nights. He played his first consecutive nights of the season on April 21 and 22 against the Calgary Flames in games 5 and 6 of the Western Conference Quarterfinals. Hašek won both games, clinching the series for Detroit. In the next round against the San Jose Sharks, the Red Wings were on the road and down two games to one, but Hašek held the Sharks to three goals in the next three games. His 28-save shutout in game six was his 13th in postseason play and sent the Red Wings to the Western Conference finals against the Anaheim Ducks. However, Hašek and the Red Wings lost in six games to the Ducks, who eventually defeated the Ottawa Senators for the Stanley Cup.

Hašek contemplated retirement in the 2007 offseason, but on July 5, 2007, he signed a one-year contract with Detroit worth $2 million with up to $2 million in bonuses,
reportedly turning down $5 million for salary cap room for the rest of the Red Wings' roster.

During the 2007–08 season, Hašek was replaced by backup Chris Osgood, who had originally been waived by the Red Wings to make way for Hašek before the 2001–02 season. When Hašek recovered and got back into his stride, Detroit chose to alternate goaltenders in tandem instead of designating either as the backup. Detroit head coach Mike Babcock announced that Hašek was to start in the 2008 playoffs. Through the first two games against the Nashville Predators, the Red Wings were victorious, but after a lackluster performance in the next two, Osgood was in goal for the remainder of the playoffs. Despite expressing disappointment at losing his starting position, Hašek maintained his professionalism in practice and continued to support his teammates, with Darren McCarty citing a close relationship between Hašek and Osgood. Eventually the Red Wings beat the Penguins in six games for the Stanley Cup.

On June 9, 2008, Hašek announced his retirement from the NHL, only five days after winning his second Stanley Cup with the Red Wings, saying he lacked the motivation for another year in the NHL. With Osgood, the two were awarded the William M. Jennings Trophy for fewest goals against on a team in the season.

Final years in Europe and retirement
In April 2009, Hašek once again came out of retirement and signed a one-year contract with HC Moeller Pardubice, the club where he started his long career. In the 2009–10 season he led his team to win the Czech league title. Hašek had three shutouts in the playoffs, one in the finals, while his Pardubice lost just one game in the playoffs before claiming 12 consecutive wins. For the 2010–11 hockey season, Hašek signed a one-year contract with HC Spartak Moscow.

On May 15, 2012, Czech website hokej.cz reported that Hašek had discussed playing for Piráti Chomutov after their promotion to the Czech Extraliga. On May 25, 2012, Czech sport website Deniksport reported that Hašek was considering a return to the NHL, possibly with the Red Wings or Tampa Bay Lightning. However, the start of the 2012–13 NHL season was delayed due to the 2012–13 NHL lockout and Hašek announced his retirement on October 9, 2012.

The Sabres retired Hašek's #39 jersey prior to a January 13, 2015 game against the Red Wings, making Hašek's number the seventh to be retired in Sabres history. In a ceremony held on January 27, 2017, during the All-Star Weekend in Los Angeles, Hašek was named one of the '100 Greatest NHL Players' in history.

International play

Hašek's most memorable international performance came in the 1998 Winter Olympics, where he led the Czech national team to the gold medal. He allowed six goals in total, with only two of them coming in the medal round. Against Team Canada in the semifinals, Hašek stopped Theoren Fleury, Ray Bourque, Joe Nieuwendyk, Eric Lindros and Brendan Shanahan in a dramatic shootout win. He then shut out the Russian team 1–0 in the final game, stopping 20 shots. He was later announced as the best goaltender in the Olympics. After he won the gold, he was quoted as saying:

His play made him one of the most popular figures in the Czech Republic, so much so that residents chanted "Hašek to the castle!" in the streets, referring to the Prague Castle, the seat of the President of the Czech Republic. In response to this, Hašek called the president Václav Havel and jokingly told him that his job was not in jeopardy.
He also helped to inspire an opera (titled Nagano) about the Czech team's gold medal victory,
and in 2003, Petr Pravec and Lenka Šarounová named an asteroid (8217 Dominikhašek) in his honour.

In the 2006 Winter Olympics in Turin, Italy, Hašek played for just nine minutes and twenty-five seconds, until he injured his right adductor muscle.
Despite his absence, the Czechs managed to earn the bronze medal with backup goaltender Tomáš Vokoun, which Hašek received as well.

Style of play

Hašek had an unorthodox goaltending style.
He was extraordinarily flexible and was jokingly described in a MasterCard commercial as having "a Slinky for a spine".
In order to cover the bottom of the net, where most goals are scored, Hašek dropped down on almost every shot. His "flopping" style was derived from him flailing in the crease, using every part of his body, including his head, to stop the puck. Hašek occasionally dropped his stick and covered the puck with his stick hand, whereas most goaltenders would use the glove hand instead.
In response to the speculation he received from his style, Hašek explained:

Hašek's unique style attracted fans to games.
Because of his flexibility, Hašek could make difficult saves that other goalies could not—an opposing coach once referred to them as "miracle saves". These types of saves include toe-stops and a maneuver known as the "Hašek roll". Hašek was also known for his strict regimen of conditioning. During the off-season between May and September 2006, he lost a considerable amount of weight to increase his flexibility. Hašek was one of the last goaltenders to wear a helmet-and-cage combo rather than a contemporary hybrid goalie mask. The last few included his former teammate Chris Osgood, who left the NHL three years after Hašek, Tim Thomas of the Boston Bruins and Rick DiPietro actually borrowed one of Osgood's helmets for a short time with the New York Islanders while he recovered from a facial injury.

Personal life
Hašek and his former wife Alena have a son named Michael (born 1990) and a daughter named Dominika (born 1995). Dominika is the lead singer of the electro-pop band We Are Domi, which represented the Czech Republic in the Eurovision Song Contest 2022, finishing in 22nd place. In November 2012 Hašek announced his divorce after 23 years of marriage.
He divides much of his free time playing squash and inline hockey, where he plays defense. When he was younger, Hašek played competitive football as a midfielder, and was a junior tennis champion in Eastern Bohemia.
His brother Martin is also a competitive athlete and played for the Czech Republic football team AC Sparta Prague before retiring and eventually deciding to coach. Hobby-wise, Hašek claims that he has been a fan of professional wrestling since his Buffalo days, and says that he mostly follows his favorite wrestlers, Stone Cold Steve Austin and Don "The Rock" Muraco.

Because of his formal education, Hašek stands out among Czech sportsmen. He earned a university degree after studying history and the Czech language in the Faculty of Education at the University of Hradec Králové, which qualified him to be a teacher, and led him to teach high school classes. Hašek also had a brand of sportswear named Dominator Clothing, which was launched shortly after the Nagano Olympics in 1998. It also had two locations in Michigan for a short time. However, sales were low, and the Dominator brand was forced out of business in 2008.
In May 2001, Hašek founded the Dominik Hašek Youth Hockey League/Hašek's Heroes, and donated over $1 million to help underprivileged children in Buffalo play hockey.
He organized a charity hockey game in Prague in 1998, and donated the profits to hospitals in the Czech Republic.

Hašek was known to appreciate humor to keep team spirits up, and often jokes about his resemblance to Cosmo Kramer of Seinfeld. In the late 1990s, he was featured in a MasterCard commercial that praised his flexibility. On November 26, 2006, Mark Parisi's comic panel off the mark featured a comic about Hašek's childhood.

Throughout his long career, Hašek was represented by agent Ritch Winter.

Inline hockey game incident
During an inline hockey game on May 18, 2003, Hašek was accused of assaulting another player. He was playing as a defender for Bonfire Střída when he crosschecked Martin Šíla. The prosecutor in the case, Lenka Strnadová, ruled two months later that there was no evidence that Hašek intended bodily harm and recommended the case be treated as a misdemeanor, punishable only by fine (US$95 maximum), rather than a felony where jail time would have been possible. Hašek's lawyer Pavel Jelínek announced in a statement that media reports about the incident were exaggerated, with Šíla not having sustained any documented injuries. In October 2003, the country's top prosecutor overruled Strnadová, saying her ruling was unlawful because the case had not been properly investigated. The Pardubice prosecutor's office then investigated the case again, and reached the same decision as Strnadová.

Legacy

Milestones
Hašek earned his 300th National Hockey League win on October 15, 2005, in a 5–1 home victory with the Ottawa Senators over the Boston Bruins. He stopped 34 of 35 shots and was holding a shutout until Bruins forward Pat Leahy jammed a loose puck under him three minutes into the third period. He became the twenty-second goaltender to reach the milestone. He is the oldest goaltender in NHL history to post a 30-win season, and in 1997, he became the second goaltender to win the Lester B. Pearson Award for most outstanding player in the league (Mike Liut won the Lester B. Pearson Trophy as the league's MVP as determined by his peers in 1981). He is also the only goaltender to win the Hart Trophy twice for most valuable player, and was only one Vezina Trophy away from tying Jacques Plante's record of seven.

Records
In nine seasons with the Buffalo Sabres, Hašek acquired over 25 franchise records, including most all-time games played, wins, shutouts and lowest goals against average. He also holds the Sabres' record for most shutouts in a single season with 13 in 1997–98, and lowest goals against average in a single season with a total of 1.87 in 1998–99. During the Detroit Red Wings' championship run in 2002, Hašek set franchise records for most games played, minutes played, wins and shutouts in a playoff year. He holds several notable NHL records:

General
All-time
 1st place – Highest career save percent (.922)
 2nd place – Most games played by a European  born goaltender (735)
 6th place – Most shutouts (81)
 7th place – Lowest goals against average (2.20)
 11th place – Most wins (389)Regular season
 First European goalie to lead the NHL in GAA (1993–94)
 First goalie since 1974 to have a GAA below 2.00 (1993–94)
 Most shutouts in one month (six in 1997–98)Playoffs
All-time
 2nd place – Most shutouts in one season (6)
 3rd place – Most shutouts (15)
 10th place – Most wins (61)

One of the most impressive single-game performances by any player in NHL history came on April 27, 1994. Hašek made 70 saves in a four-overtime shutout. The opposing goalie was Martin Brodeur, then a rookie, who made 49 saves before being beaten by Dave Hannan and the Sabres beat New Jersey 1–0, which helped the Sabres to tie the series 3–3 in the first round of the Stanley Cup playoffs. Hašek's 70 saves set a record, which still stands, for the most saves in a game without allowing a goal.

Career statistics
Bolded numbers indicate season leader

Regular season and playoffs

International
Bolded numbers indicate tournament leader

Sources:

Awards

NHL

Nominations

Czechoslovak and Czech awards

International

Transactions
 June 8, 1983 – Drafted by Chicago in the 10th round, 199th overall
 August 7, 1992 – Traded to Buffalo for Stephane Beauregard and a fourth-round pick (Éric Dazé)
 March 19, 1998 – Agreed with Buffalo on a three-year, twenty-six million dollar contract
 June 30, 2001 – Traded to Detroit for Vyacheslav Kozlov, a first-round pick in 2002 (Daniel Paille) and future considerations
 June 25, 2002 – Announced retirement from professional hockey
 July 8, 2003 – Returned to Detroit as an active player
 July 6, 2004 – Signed as a free agent by Ottawa
 July 27, 2005 – Contract option exercised by Ottawa for 2005–06 season
 July 31, 2006 – Signed as a free agent by Detroit
 July 5, 2007 – Signed as a free agent by Detroit
 June 9, 2008 – Again announced retirement from professional hockey
 April 21, 2009 – Signed as a free agent by HC Pardubice of the Czech Extraliga
 June 7, 2010 – Signed as a free agent by Spartak Moscow of the KHL
 October 9, 2012 – Announced retirement from professional hockey for the third time.

See also
List of NHL statistical leaders

Notes

References

External links

 
 Dominik Hasek at HockeyGoalies.org
 
 
 

1965 births
Buffalo Sabres players
Chicago Blackhawks draft picks
Chicago Blackhawks players
Czech ice hockey goaltenders
Czechoslovak ice hockey goaltenders
Detroit Red Wings players
Czech expatriate ice hockey players in Russia
Hart Memorial Trophy winners
HC Dukla Jihlava players
HC Dynamo Pardubice players
HC Spartak Moscow players
Hockey Hall of Fame inductees
Ice hockey players at the 1988 Winter Olympics
Ice hockey players at the 1998 Winter Olympics
Ice hockey players at the 2002 Winter Olympics
Ice hockey players at the 2006 Winter Olympics
Indianapolis Ice players
IIHF Hall of Fame inductees
Lester B. Pearson Award winners
Living people
Medalists at the 1998 Winter Olympics
Medalists at the 2006 Winter Olympics
National Hockey League All-Stars
National Hockey League players with retired numbers
Olympic bronze medalists for the Czech Republic
Olympic gold medalists for the Czech Republic
Olympic ice hockey players of Czechoslovakia
Olympic ice hockey players of the Czech Republic
Olympic medalists in ice hockey
Ottawa Senators players
Sportspeople from Pardubice
Recipients of Medal of Merit (Czech Republic)
Stanley Cup champions
Vezina Trophy winners
William M. Jennings Trophy winners
Czechoslovak expatriate sportspeople in the United States
Czechoslovak expatriate ice hockey people
Czech expatriate ice hockey players in the United States
Czech expatriate ice hockey players in Canada